Chelonodontops laticeps, also known as the bluespotted blaasop, is a species of pufferfish in the family Tetraodontidae. It is native to the western Indian Ocean on the coast of Africa, from South Africa north to Tanzania, and around Madagascar. FishBase includes also Papua New Guinea (Western Central Pacific) in its range.

It is a tropical species found in quiet, weedy areas of marine and brackish waters. It reaches  in total length.

References

Tetraodontidae
Fish of the Indian Ocean
Taxa named by J. L. B. Smith
Fish described in 1948